The Dinamo Sports Center is a gymnasium in St. Petersburg, Russia.  The Sports Center has twelve outdoor courts (six clay, six synthetic) and three indoor courts. There's also an indoor pool for the non-summer season (closed June to September) and a football field.

FC Dinamo București has its youth center based in the Sports Center, where they have eight dressing rooms for the players, one for the coaches, one for the referees, a medical center and a store room for the equipment. Also, the center has many training grounds, among them the Piți Varga field.

Events 

 First held in 1993, the Dinamo Sports Center holds the Mikhail Voronin Cup, a gymnast competition.
 In 2004, Dinamo played host to a demonstration and celebration of Russian martial arts traditions, including Ryabko's Systema.

References

Indoor arenas in Russia